Malakai Tiwa (born 3 October 1986) in Fiji is a footballer who plays as a midfielder. He has previously played for Hekari United. He currently plays for Ba in the National Football League and the Fiji national football team.

International career

International goals
Scores and results list Fiji's goal tally first.

References 

1986 births
Living people
Fijian footballers
Fiji international footballers
Association football midfielders
Ba F.C. players
Hekari United players
2008 OFC Nations Cup players
2012 OFC Nations Cup players
2016 OFC Nations Cup players